The Mathewson Farm is an historic farm on 544 Greenville Avenue in Johnston, Rhode Island.  It is an agricultural remnant of the formerly rural village of Belknap.  The centerpiece of the farm complex is a late 18th-century farmhouse with vernacular Federal styling.  Surviving outbuildings of the farm include a barn from the early 20th century, a henhouse, and a silo.  This property was developed as a farm by William Mathewson in the 1790s, and was actively farmed by his descendants until the 1940s.

The farm was added to the National Register of Historic Places in 2001.

See also
National Register of Historic Places listings in Providence County, Rhode Island

References

Farms on the National Register of Historic Places in Rhode Island
Houses in Providence County, Rhode Island
Buildings and structures in Johnston, Rhode Island
National Register of Historic Places in Providence County, Rhode Island
1750 establishments in Rhode Island